Eilema angustula is a moth of the subfamily Arctiinae first described by Hervé de Toulgoët in 1965. It is found on Madagascar.

References

Moths described in 1965
angustula